The InterNational Committee for Information Technology Standards (INCITS), (pronounced "insights"), is an ANSI-accredited standards development organization composed of Information technology developers. It was formerly known as the X3 and NCITS.

INCITS is the central U.S. forum dedicated to creating technology standards.  INCITS is accredited by the American National Standards Institute (ANSI) and is affiliated with the Information Technology Industry Council, a global policy advocacy organization that represents U.S. and global innovation companies.

INCITS coordinates technical standards activity between ANSI in the US and joint ISO/IEC committees worldwide.  This provides a mechanism to create standards that will be implemented in many nations. As such, INCITS' Executive Board also serves as ANSI's Technical Advisory Group for ISO/IEC Joint Technical Committee 1. JTC 1 is responsible for International standardization in the field of information technology.
INCITS operates through consensus.

Governance
INCITS is guided by its Executive Board. 
The INCITS Executive Board established more than 50 Technical Committees, Task Groups and Study Groups that are constantly developing standards for new technologies and updating standards for older products.

Mission
An open, collaborative community that enhances the competitiveness of U.S. organizations and brings technological advancement to society through the development and promotion of consensus-driven U.S. and global Information Technology standards.

Standards development
More than 1200 standards have been created and approved through the INCITS process, with many more in development.  American National Standards are voluntary and serve U.S. interests well because all materially affected stakeholders have the opportunity to work together to create them.  INCITS-approved standards only become mandatory when, and if, they are adopted or referenced by the government or when market forces make them imperative.

Given the responsibilities and the expenditures associated with U.S. participation in international standards activities, INCITS considers participation as a "P" member of ISO/IEC JTC 1, as a declaration of support for the international committee's technical work. INCITS policy is to adopt as "Identical" American National Standards all ISO/IEC or ISO standards that fall within its program of work, with exceptions as outlined in our procedures.  Accordingly, INCITS will adopt as "Identical" American National Standards all ISO/IEC or ISO standards that fall within its program of work. Similarly, INCITS will withdraw any such adopted American National Standard that has been withdrawn as an ISO/IEC or ISO International Standards.

History
INCITS was established in 1961 as the Accredited Standards Committee X3, Information Technology and is sponsored by Information Technology Industry Council (ITI),  a trade association representing providers of information technology products and services then known as the Business Equipment Manufacturers Association (BEMA) and later renamed the Computer and Business Equipment Manufacturers' Association (CBEMA). The first organizational meeting was in February 1961 with ITI (CBEMA then) taking Secretariat responsibility. X3 was established under American National Standards Institute (ANSI) procedures. The forum was renamed Accredited Standards Committee NCITS, National Committee for Information Technology Standards in 1997, and the current name was approved in 2001.

References

External links

Technical Committees, Task Groups, Study Groups
 INCITS/Artificial Intelligence
 INCITS/Big Data
 INCITS/ATA Storage Interfaces (formerly known as INCITS/T13)
 INCITS/Biometrics (formerly known as INCITS/M1)
 INCITS/Biometrics Data Interchange (formerly known as INCITS/M1.7)
 INCITS/Biometric Performance Testing (formerly known as INCITS/M1.5)
 INCITS/Blockchain
 INCITS/Brain Computer Interfaces
 INCITS/Character Sets and Internationalization (formerly known as INCITS/L2)
 INCITS/Cloud Computing (formerly known as INCITS/Cloud38)
 INCITS/Cybersecurity and Privacy (formerly known as INCITS/CS1)
 INCITS/Data Management (formerly known as INCITS/DM32)
 INCITS/Data Usage
 INCITS/Digital Manufacturing
 INCITS/Fibre Channel (formerly known as INCITS/T11)
 INCITS/Fibre Channel Physical Variants (formerly known as INCITS/T11.2)
 INCITS/Fibre Channel Interconnection Schemes (formerly known as INCITS/T11.3)
 INCITS/Geographic Information Systems (GIS) (formerly known as INCITS/L1)
 INCITS/Graphics & Imaging (formerly known as INCITS/H3)
 INCITS/IT Governance (formerly known as INCITS/GIT1)
 INCITS/ID-Cards (formerly known as INCITS/B10)
 INCITS/Secure Identification Proximity Devices (formerly known as INCITS/B10.5)
 INCITS/Driver’s License/ID Cards (formerly known as INCITS/B10.8)
 INCITS/ID-Cards Test Methods (formerly known as INCITS/B10.11)
 INCITS/Inclusive Terminology
 INCITS/Internet of Things (IoT)
 INCITS/IT and Data Center Sustainability (formerly known as INCITS/ITS39)
 INCITS/Multimedia Coding (formerly known as INCITS/L3)
 INCITS/MPEG (formerly known as INCITS/L3.1)
 INCITS/JPEG (formerly known as INCITS/L3.2)
 INCITS/Programming Languages (formerly known as INCITS/PL22)
INCITS/Fortran (formerly known as INCITS/PL22.3)
INCITS/C Language (formerly known as INCITS/PL22.11)
INCITS/C++ (formerly known as INCITS/PL22.16)
 INCITS/Networks (formerly known as INCITS/T3) 
 INCITS/Office Equipment (formerly known as INCITS/W1)
 INCITS/Quantum Computing
 INCITS/SCSI (formerly known as INCITS/T10) 
 INCITS/Smart Cities
 INCITS/Software and Systems Engineering
 INCITS/Trustworthiness

Social Media
Find INCITS on social media:
 Twitter
 Facebook
 LinkedIn

Others
 Homepage of INCITS, includes a list of INCITS standards
 Contact INCITS
 ANSI Accredited Standards Developers (ANSI Accredited SDO )
 JTC 1 Homepage
 Charles A. Phillips Papers, 1959-1985 (Historical reference to BEMA)

Organizations established in 1961
Standards organizations in the United States
Information technology organizations